Kentucky Route 122 (KY 122) is a  state highway in Kentucky. It runs from KY 114 east of Prestonsburg to U.S. Route 460 (US 460) west of Shelbiana.

Future

Currently, KY 122 ends at US 460 and KY 80 on the banks of the Levisa Fork of the Big Sandy River. However, a new route for US 460 is under construction to the south. It is unknown where KY 122 will end at once the new highway is complete.

Major intersections

References

0122
Transportation in Floyd County, Kentucky
Transportation in Pike County, Kentucky